Common Sense Australia is an Australian adaptation of the British series of the same name and a spinoff to Gogglebox Australia. The series, which is produced by Endemol Shine Australia, is a co-production between subscription television (STV) network The LifeStyle Channel and free-to-air (FTA) network Network Ten. It will air on The LifeStyle Channel first, and then airs on Network Ten a day later.

Common Sense was commissioned in November 2016, similar to Gogglebox Australia, is a local adaptation of a British series of the same name, and is jointly commissioned by both Foxtel and Network Ten.

Format
Common Sense features a cast of real people and their real opinions as they gather the week's most talked-about news topics while in conversation with one another in their workplaces, from topics of general news and current affairs to the latest in politics, sport and popular culture.

Cast

Series overview
<onlyinclude>{| class="wikitable" style="text-align:center;"
|-
! style="padding: 0 9px;" colspan="2" rowspan="2"| Season
! style="padding: 0 9px;" rowspan="2"| Episodes
! colspan="3"| Network Ten (FTA)
! colspan="3"| The Lifestyle Channel (STV)
|-
! style="padding: 0 8px;"| Timeslot
! style="padding: 0 8px;"| First aired
! style="padding: 0 8px;"| Last aired
! style="padding: 0 8px;"| Timeslot
! style="padding: 0 8px;"| First aired
! style="padding: 0 8px;"| Last aired 
|-
 |style="background: #ADD8E6;"|
 | [[Common Sense Australia#Episodes|1]]
 | 8
 | rowspan="2"| Thursday 8:30pm
 | 
 | 
 | rowspan="2"| Wednesday 7:30pm
 | 
 | 
|}

Episodes

References

Lifestyle (Australian TV channel) original programming
Network 10 original programming
2010s Australian reality television series
2017 Australian television series debuts
2017 Australian television series endings
English-language television shows
Australian television series based on British television series